Delaware's 17th Senate district is one of 21 districts in the Delaware Senate. It has been represented by Democrat W. Charles Paradee since 2018, succeeding fellow Democrat Brian Bushweller.

Geography
District 17 is based in Dover, covering most of the city proper as well as the nearby Kent County communities of Camden, Wyoming, and Rodney Village.

Like all districts in the state, the 17th Senate district is located entirely within Delaware's at-large congressional district. It overlaps with the 28th, 29th, 31st, 32nd, and 34th districts of the Delaware House of Representatives.

Recent election results
Delaware Senators are elected to staggered four-year terms. Under normal circumstances, the 17th district holds elections in midterm years, except immediately after redistricting, when all seats are up for election regardless of usual cycle.

2018

2014

2012

Federal and statewide results in District 17

References 

17
Kent County, Delaware